Voice writing is a method used for court reporting, medical transcription, CART, and closed captioning. Using the voice writing method, a court reporter speaks directly into a stenomask or speech silencer - a hand-held mask containing one or two microphones and voice-dampening materials. As the reporter repeats the testimony into the recorder, the mask prevents the reporter from being heard during testimony.

Purpose and function
Voice writers can be used to record everything that is said by judges, witnesses, attorneys, and other parties to a proceeding, including gestures and emotional reactions, and either provide real-time feed or prepare transcripts afterwards.

In medical transcription, some transcriptionists use voice writing, versus typing, when working out of their own home. They receive audio files and use a voice recognition program to translate voice to text. No mask is needed, but a good headset with appropriate microphone is necessary.  Sometimes an updated sound card needs to be added in order to have excellent clarity for the voice recognition software. This can be done easily with a small sound card which is attached to the microphone cord and then inserts into a USB port.  A foot pedal is also used.

A voice writing system consists of a stenomask, an external sound digitizer, a laptop, speech recognition software. A foot pedal can plug into a computer's USB port.

A real-time voice writer's words go through the mask's cable to an external USB digital signal processor, From there the words go into the computer's speech recognition engine, for conversion into streaming text. The reporter can send the streamed text to a) the Internet; b) a computer file; c) a television station for subtitling; d) to an end-user who is reading the captions via their laptop, tablet, smart phone, or e) software which formats the results in a way most familiar to judges, attorneys, or subtitling consumers.

Voice writers enjoy very high accuracy rates, based upon pure physiology. The route taken by a person's words goes from the mouth to the reporter's ear, brain, and "inner" voice. This form of repetition is naturally effortless; it is what we all do in our daily conversation, as we listen to a person speak, or when we read a book. So the most natural extension of this process is to psychologically switch the repetition mechanism from "inner voice" to the physiological "spoken voice." Therefore, we minimize the introduction of cognitive overhead in our task of routing the spoken word to its permanent destination as printed words. This streamlined process allows voice writers to achieve excellent performance for many continuous hours and greater than 98 percent accuracy at speeds as high as 350 words per minute.

Voice writers produce the same products as their stenotype colleagues, including transcripts in all electronic and printed formats. Realtime verbatim reporters connect their laptops to captioning equipment, real-time viewer programs, and provide attorneys or other clients with
computer files at the end of the sessions. Only the physical way of capturing speakers' words differentiates voice writing from other methods of court reporting. Every other aspect of this profession is the same, with the exception of the time required to learn the skill, which is much shorter with voice writing.

Voice writing method
The method of court reporting known as voice writing, formerly called "stenomask," was developed by Horace Webb in the World War II era. Prior to inventing voice writing, Webb was a Gregg shorthand writer. Gregg shorthand is a multi-level process in which the reporter records the proceedings using shorthand, then dictates from his notes into a tape recorder. The dictation process alone requires two hours for every one hour of testimony. After the testimony is transferred to audio tape, a transcriptionist types out an official documentation of the proceedings. Mr. Webb wanted to create a reporting method that allowed court reporters to dictate directly during proceedings, eliminating the shorthand process altogether.

Horace Webb and two colleagues spent several years designing the stenomask and perfecting the voicewriting method. The court reporter speaks directly into the stenomask – a handheld mask with a voice silencer. The silencer prevents the court reporter from disturbing proceedings while repeating everything that occurs during testimony -– even unspoken answers, gestures and reactions. Unfortunately, the voicewriting method did not catch on until the method was tested by the U.S. Navy and adopted by the military justice school in Newport, Rhode Island. From then on, the stenomask method of court reporting gained widespread acceptance.

Voice writers have long been available to make the record through the use of a stenomask with a voice silencer and analog tapes. Voice writers not only repeat every word stated by the attorneys, witnesses, judges and other parties to a proceeding but also verbally identify the speaker. They even punctuate the text, describe activities as they take place, and, in some cases, mark exhibits.

Now, however, new technologies are available to them. Digital recording offers a clearer, better-defined soundtrack, making transcription easier and even more accurate.

New technology, in the form of speech recognition CAT systems, affords the voice writer the opportunity to have the spoken words instantly turned into text on a laptop computer or computer workstation. As a result, the voice writer is now able to produce real-time text feeds within the courtroom and download them in ASCII format for distribution immediately following a proceeding. The equipment used by real-time voice writers can also interface with all litigation-support software.

Training
All court reporters require the same basic academic background, regardless of method. This includes legal and medical language, business law, and English. The skills track is where the methods diverge. A voice writing student can become real-time certifiable well within the 24-month associate degree window. Paralegals and legal secretaries, because they've already taken nearly the same set of core academics required by court reporting, can become proficient in three to six months. In under 12 months, a paralegal or legal secretary can become real-time certified.

References

Court reporting
Transcription (linguistics)